The 2013–2014 Israel Football League season was the seventh season of the Israel Football League (IFL) and concluded with the Tel Aviv Pioneers defeating the Jerusalem Lions, 80–28, in Israel Bowl VII.

Regular season 
The regular season consisted of a nine game schedule. The Rebels finished the season undefeated and earned the top seed for the playoffs.

Playoffs 

In the Wild Card round, the Pioneers defeated the Troopers while the Lions defeated the Underdogs. In the Semifinals, the top two seeds were upset, with the Pioneers defeating the Rebels and the Hammers defeating the Lions. In Israel Bowl VII, the Pioneers crushed the Lions 80-28, with Ronny Moscona earning Israel Bowl MVP honors.

  * Indicates overtime victory

Awards 

 Most Valuable Player: Dani Eastman, RB/DB/RS, Judean Rebels
 Offensive Player of the Year: Dani Eastman, RB, Judean Rebels
 Defensive Player of the Year: Yoni Cooper, DE, Jerusalem Lions
 Special Team Player of the Year: Jonathan Curran, RS/P, Ramat HaSharon Hammers
 Coaching Staff of the Year: Judean Rebels
 Offensive Rookie of the Year: Avrami Farkas, QB, Judean Rebels
 Defensive Rookie of the Year: Elie Mendlowitz, DB, Judean Rebels

References 

Israel Football League Seasons